Hartismere is a state funded co-educational day school for scholars aged 11–18 in Eye, a town in High Suffolk. The headmaster is James McAtear who joined the School in 2006.

In 2009 the school changed its status to become a Foundation School, the first in Suffolk. In September 2010 the school became Suffolk's first Academy and the first in England. It has been awarded Outstanding status by Ofsted on three successive occasions (2010, 2014 and 2018). The school has specialisms in Mathematics, Music, Science and Sport and in 2013 it was awarded Leading Edge status.

History
The site of the current School was excavated in 2008 revealing continuous habitation dating back to Neolithic times. Enclosures included a full stone age burial, significant quantities of Roman coinage and a Saxon smithing area. The school has been gathering materials to set up a museum of local history. Planned exhibits will include Stone Age, Bronze Age, Celtic, Romano-British, Anglo-Saxon, Medieval and early modern materials. It also aims to tell the story of Eye airfield and the role of the school during World War II.

The school was founded in the 15th century. Its original form predates the grammar school which was founded c. 1495. A variety of sites have been occupied by the School which has existed as a National School, a County School and was joined by a Secondary Modern in 1935. The Grammar School was closed in the late 1960s. The school became a Comprehensive and became known as Hartismere shortly thereafter. The school was temporarily closed during the summer term of the 2019-20 academic year due to the COVID-19 pandemic before reopening in September. The School was closed again due to the pandemic in the spring term of the academic year of 2020-21.

Academy Status
Hartismere High School became Suffolk's first Foundation School in 2009. This meant that its Governing Body took ownership of the land and buildings of the school and became the employer of its own staff and its own admissions authority.

Following this it became the first school in Suffolk to attain converter Academy on 1 September 2010. It became one of the first secondary schools to do so in England on the same day. At that point only schools graded outstanding by Ofsted were permitted to do so.

The Hartismere Family of Schools
Hartismere School was given Sponsor Academy status on 1 September 2010, the first in England to receive this status. However, it was only in 2016 that the multi-Academy Trust was set up. The became known as the Hartismere Family of Schools. On 1 May 2016 Benjamin Britten Music Academy and Centre of Excellence in mathematics became part of the Hartismere Family of Schools. On 1 May 2018 Woods Loke Primary joined the Hartismere Family. This was followed by Somerleyton Primary on 1 January 2019.

Ofsted inspections
Hartismere High School was regarded as a Satisfactory School by Ofsted prior to its 2006 inspection. During that year it was graded as Good before two successive Inspections, the first in 2010 and the second in 2014 graded the school as Outstanding. The school is now considered one of the best in Suffolk, in 2021 former student Niles Schilder called the teachers at the school ‘fabulous’ and ‘very supportive.’

The Hartismere Hundred
The School motto of serving is seen by its staff and children as embodied in The Hartismere Hundred. This is the system by which the school supports one hundred charities annually and seeks to raise at least £100000 rotationally. It harks back to the geographical Hartismere Hundred of the Doomsday Book. Scholars are introduced to this form of service in the first year of Lower School through supporting Guide Dogs for the Blind.

Grades and Results 
In the academic year of 2018/19 99.3% of A Level students achieved a passing grade with 89% getting an A* to C grade. On results day of 2019 headmaster James McAtear said: “These results are a testimony to the hard work of all our staff, governors and students and to the support given to them by their parents.”

By the accident year of 2020/2021 these results improved further to 100% of A Level students passing with 94% achieveing an A* to C grade.

Headmasters
1445-1495, Joseph Coutts;
1495-1532, Thomas Golding;
1532-1548, No Headmaster;
1650-1672, Thomas Brown;
1675-?, Thomas Brown (returned);
1822-?, Rev John Knevett;
1837-1874, Rev. Charles Notley;
1888-1921, Mr Frederick Bray;
1937-1965, Mr Eric Crinean;
1982-1985, Mr Tony Lines;
1986-2006, Mr Richard Hewitt;
2006–present, Mr James McAtear

Facilities

The Lines hall hosts daily assembly and serves as the school's Drama studio and venue for evening concerts. It was named after Tony Lines, Headmaster from 1982-5, who died in service.

The Reading Room is a reference only library for the use of College scholars only. It is equipped with Mac computers and hosts the College cultural programme on Wednesday mornings.

Notable former pupils
Dan Hipkiss: played Centre for Bath Rugby and Leicester Tigers; he represented England at U16, U17, U18, U21 and England A. His full England debut came versus Wales in a World Cup warm up match at Twickenham on 4 August 2007. He played for England in the Rugby World Cup final in Paris in 2007.
Bessie Turner: singer/songwriter now based in Ipswich.
Stuart O'Keefe: (1991- ) professional footballer who plays as a central midfielder for League One club Gillingham.
Niles Schilder: (2002- ) English Archeologist and Historian.

References

External links
 

Academies in Suffolk
Educational institutions established in the 15th century
15th-century establishments in England
Secondary schools in Suffolk
Eye, Suffolk